|}

The Sandringham Handicap is a flat handicap horse race in Great Britain open to three-year-old fillies. It is run at Ascot over a distance of 1 mile (1,609 metres), and it is scheduled to take place each year in June on the fourth day of the Royal Ascot meeting.  The race was called the Fern Hill Rated Stakes until 2001, and was part of the Ascot Heath meeting held on the Saturday after Royal Ascot. Prior to 2018 it was run as a Listed handicap but was downgraded by the British Horseracing Authority to comply with a new rule that no handicap race could carry Listed or Group race status.

Winners since 1988

See also
 Horse racing in Great Britain
 List of British flat horse races

References

 Paris-Turf:
Racing Post:

Ascot Racecourse
Flat races in Great Britain
Open mile category horse races